Odites ternatella is a moth in the family Depressariidae. It was described by Otto Staudinger in 1859. It is found in Portugal, Spain, Luxembourg and Romania, as well as on Sicily.

The wingspan is 14–15 mm. The forewings are dirty straw yellow with three dark point in the form of a triangle. There is a row of black dots along the outer margin. The hindwings are light yellow in males, more blackish in females.

References

Moths described in 1859
Odites